Hay Valley is a small locality in South Australia,  north of Nairne. It overlies the geographical feature of the same name and was originally established as a named subsection within the Hundred of Kanmantoo. In 2016 the population was 25.

Notes and references

Towns in South Australia